8th & O is a split light rail station in the Sacramento RT Light Rail system, served by all three lines:  Blue, Gold and Green Lines.  It is located at the intersection of 8th and O Streets in Downtown Sacramento, California, with the split platforms located on each side of 8th Street where the line splits into one-way couplets. The station is near the historical and cultural district of the city.

Platforms and tracks

Sacramento Regional Transit light rail stations
Railway stations in the United States opened in 1987